The Abbot of Dundrennan was the head of the Cistercian monastic community of Dundrennan Abbey, Galloway. It was founded by Fergus of Galloway in 1142. Dundrennan was a large and powerful monastery in the context of the south-west. It became secularised and protestantised in the 16th century. In 1606 it was finally turned into a secular lordship in for John Murray of Lochmaben, afterwards earl of Annandale.

The royal warrant in 1886 which revived the office of Dean of the Chapel Royal also gave the Dean the titles of Abbot of Crossraguel and Abbot of Dundrennan.

The following is a list of abbots and commendators:


List of abbots
 Silvanus, fl. 1167
 William, 1180
 Nicholas, l196 x 1200
 [? Egidius], fl. 13th century
 Gaufridus (Geoffrey), 1209 x 1222
 Robert Matursal, 1223 x 1224
 Jordan, 1236
 Leonius, 1236–1239
 Ricardus (Richard), 1239
 Adam I, 1250
 Brian, 1250–1273
 Adam II, 1294
 Walter, 1296
 John, 1305
 William, 1332
 Giles, 1347 - 1358 x 1381
 Thomas, 1381
 Patrick MacMen, x 1426
 Thomas de Levinstone, 1429
 Patrick Maligussal [Maxwell], 1431
 Thomas de Levinstone (again), x1440-1454
 Alexander Brady, 1441
 John Hunter, 1441
 William Lowierii (Lilburn), 1454–1472
 John Fuogo [Fogo], c. 1473-1476
 Alexander Pettigrew, x 1474-1479
 John Lockhart, 1476
 Hugh Foulis, 1479
 William Bewister, 1485
 Edward Story (Edward Meldrum), 1488–1515
 Robert Hunter, 1490
 James Hay, 1516-1524
 John Dingwall, 1518
 Adam Symson, 1518
 Edward Bangal, 1519
 John Maxwell, fl. 1524
 Cristofer Boyd, fl. 1526-1527

List of commendators
 Henry Wemyss, 1529-1541
 Adam Blackadder, 1541–1562
 Edward Maxwell, 1562–1599
 John Murray of Lochmaben, 1599–1606

Notes

Bibliography
 Thompson, Barbara, "Monks and Other Officers of Dundrennan", (Dundrennan Abbey; unpublished)
 Watt, D.E.R. & Shead, N.F. (eds.), The Heads of Religious Houses in Scotland from the 12th to the 16th Centuries, The Scottish Records Society, New Series, Volume 24, (Edinburgh, 2001), pp. 63–7

Cistercian abbots by monastery
Scottish abbots
Lists of abbots